Noel Phillips (born 28 March 1950) is an Australian former professional tennis player.

A native of Sydney, Phillips played four years of collegiate tennis for Austin Peay State University in Tennessee. He was named OVC Player of the Year in both 1973 and 1974. After college he competed professionally and made the second round of the 1977 Australian Open, with a win over Bob Carmichael. He defeated Phil Dent en route to the round of 16 at the 1978 New South Wales Open and was a quarter-finalist at Sarasota in 1979.

References

External links
 
 

1950 births
Living people
Australian male tennis players
Austin Peay State University alumni
College men's tennis players in the United States
Tennis players from Sydney